Christopher at Sea is a 2022 animated short film directed by Tom CJ Brown. The 20-minute short is a queer drama about identity and self-discovery and it premiered at the Venice Film Festival, where it received a nomination for the Venice Horizons Award. The film has been featured in a number of international film festivals, receiving accolades such as the Bucheon International Animation Festival, and is now qualified for the 95th Academy Awards in the eligible films under the category Best Animated Short Film..

Plot 
A young man embarks on a transatlantic journey as a passenger on a cargo ship and discovers deep feelings of solitude, fantasy and obsession.

Reception 
Since its release, the film has been selected in various festivals around the world:

References

External links 

  Official Trailer on YouTube.
 Christopher at Sea on IMDb.
 Christopher at Sea on Unifrance.'''

2022 films
French animated short films
2022 animated films
2022 short films
British animated short films
LGBT-related animation